Frank Green (16 November 1918 – 8 August 1974) was a British ice hockey player. He competed for Great Britain in the men's tournament at the 1948 Winter Olympics.

References

1918 births
1974 deaths
Ice hockey players at the 1948 Winter Olympics
Irish ice hockey players
Olympic ice hockey players of Great Britain
Sportspeople from County Kerry